Louis, Prince of Nassau-Saarbrücken (3 January 1745 in Saarbrücken – 2 March 1794 in Aschaffenburg) was the last ruling prince of Nassau-Saarbrücken.  He ruled from 1768 until the French Revolution.

Life 
Louis was born in Saarbrücken as the second child and first son of William Henry of Nassau-Saarbrücken and his wife Princess Sophie of Erbach-Erbach.  Like his father, he was educated at the University of Strasbourg.  His Grand Tour led to England (from 1759 to 1766), and the Netherlands, France, and Germany.

On 30 October 1766 Louis married at Schwarzburg Castle to Princess Wilhelmine of Schwarzburg-Rudolstadt (1751–1780). The marriage was an unhappy one, and Wihelmine retreated to Hallberg Castle, where she raised their son:
 Henry Louis (1768–1797)

Outside his marriage, Louis fathered two illegitimate children with Baroness Amalie Frederike of Dorsberg, Frederika Louisa (1771), who married François Leclerc d'Alteville, and Louis Charles Philip (1774-1871). On 28 February 1787, he married her maidservant Katharina Kest (1757–1829).  Since she was a commoner, Louis rose her to Countess of Ottweiler.  From this morganatic marriage, he had seven other children, including his youngest son Adolph:
 Louis Albert (1775–1784)
 Charles Louis (1776–1799)
 Louise (1778–1855)
 Henry (1779–1781)
 Louis (1785–1796)
 Catherine (1786–1818)
 Adolph Louis (1789–1812)

In 1787, the Emperor legitimized their marriage. In 1789, Louis XVI of France conferred upon Katharina the title Duchess of Dillange.

After his father's death in 1768, Louis took up the business of government in Nassau-Saarbrücken.  He largely continued his father's economic policies, but was increasingly subject to financial constraints, so that he had to mortgage the Lordship of Jugenheim to the principality of Nassau-Usingen from 1769 until 1777.  In 1770, he requested Emperor Joseph to appoint a Debt Commission.  This commission was dissolved in 1782.  Since his financial position was still tight, Louis moved his seat of government from the palace in Saarbrücken to his smaller hunting lodges in the surrounding area.

Despite his tight financial position, Louis was able to complete some construction projects.

He was an enlightened absolutist ruler.  He issued new regulations for agriculture and forestry and reformed the school system.  He also reformed the penal code and abolished torture.

In 1793, his health was failing when he fled before the French Revolution to Aschaffenburg.  He died there in exile, and was buried in the Evangelical St. Lawrence Church in Usingen.  On 23 November 1995, his body was transferred to the Castle Church in Saarbrücken.

Ancestors

References 
 Albert Ruppersberg: Geschichte der Grafschaft Saarbrücken,vol. 2, Saarbrücken, 2nd ed., 1910 (reprinted: St. Ingbert, 1979), p. 295-372

External links 
 The funeral of Prince Louis of Nassau-Saarbrücken
 Louis of Nassau-Saarbrücken in the Saarland biographies

Princes of Nassau
People from Saarbrücken
House of Nassau
1745 births
1794 deaths
18th-century German people
Recipients of the Order of the White Eagle (Poland)